Paulo Eduardo Andrade Ponte (June 24, 1931 Fortaleza, Brazil - March 15, 2009) was the Brazilian Archbishop of the Roman Catholic Archdiocese of São Luís do Maranhão from 1984 until his retirement in 2005.  He had previously served as the Bishop of the Roman Catholic Diocese of Itapipoca from 1971 until 1984, when Ponte was elevated to the Archbishop of São Luís do Maranhão by Pope John Paul II.

Paulo Eduardo Andrade Ponte died on March 15, 2009, in São Luís, Maranhão, Brazil, at the age of 77.

References 
 Catholic Hierarchy: Archbishop Paulo Eduardo Andrade Ponte †

1931 births
2009 deaths
20th-century Roman Catholic archbishops in Brazil
People from Fortaleza
People from São Luís, Maranhão
21st-century Roman Catholic archbishops in Brazil
Roman Catholic archbishops of São Luís do Maranhão
Roman Catholic bishops of Itapipoca